Benvar (also Romanized as Benvār and Bonvār; also known as Boneh Vār) is a village in Jastun Shah Rural District, Hati District, Lali County, Khuzestan Province, Iran. At the 2006 census, its population was 39, in 7 families.

References 

Populated places in Lali County